141.TB. in SNCF's classification system could refer to:

 1-141.TB, ex Est 4401 to 4512
 2-141.TB, ex Nord 4.1701 and 4.1702
 3-141.TB, ex État 42-401 to 42-407, exx PO 5616-series
 4-141.TB, ex PO-Midi 141.616 to 141.740, exx PO 5616 to 5740